Kühnert or Kuehnert is a German surname. Notable people with the surname include:

Ernst Gustav Kühnert (1885–1961), Estonian architect and art historian
Floé Kühnert (born 1984), German pole vaulter
Kevin Kühnert (born 1989), German politician
Steffi Kühnert (born 1963), German actress

See also
Kuhnert

German-language surnames
Surnames from given names